Dalhousie Regional High School is located in Dalhousie, New Brunswick. Dalhousie Regional High School is in the Anglophone North School District.

See also
 List of schools in New Brunswick
 Anglophone North School District

References

Schools in Restigouche County, New Brunswick
High schools in New Brunswick